The Queen Mary Cathedral  also called Metropolitan Cathedral of Queen Mary is a cathedral church of Catholic worship dedicated to the Blessed Virgin Mary. The cathedral is located in the central area of Barranquilla, Colombia, western side of the Plaza de la Paz (Peace's Square), where the zero point of the city is located. The Cathedral is located within the Roman Catholic Archdiocese of Barranquilla, seat of the Archbishop and the parish Cathedral.

Description
It is a building of modernist style whose construction took 27 years and was designed by the Italian architect Angelo Mazzoni Grande (better known as Angelo Mason Grande), redesigned by the Antiochian firm "Vasquez and Cardenas' which carried out construction . The building has 4,274 square meters of built area, 92 m long, 38 m high at the top; 38 meters at the widest part because the cathedral has a bell-shaped plant that tapers in the apse of the presbytery and can accommodate 4,000 people seated.

See also
Roman Catholicism in Colombia

References

Roman Catholic cathedrals in Colombia
Buildings and structures in Barranquilla
Roman Catholic churches completed in 1969
20th-century Roman Catholic church buildings in Colombia